The Land Gone Wild is a Czech adventure historical television series. It was produced by Czech Television and filmed in four seasons in 1997, 2001, 2007 and 2012. Story is based on Jiří Stránský's novels Zdivočelá země and Aukce.

Plot
The series takes place in Communist Czechoslovakia. Story starts in first weeks after the end of the World War II and ends in 1990. It tells story of a fictional character – former Czechoslovak pilot on Western front Antonín Madera and describes real events in post-war Czechoslovakia.

Season 1
Lieutenant Colonel Madera, a war hero who served on Western Front, returns to his native village Svatý Štěpán in Ore Mountains borderland, where the majority of the series takes place. He wants to fulfill his dream to breed horses. The chairman of local MNV Brabenec gives him a decree of the national administrator for the estate that used to belong Germanized Kučera's family. Together with ex-policeman Martin Kanda and seven boys ("cowboys") who settled on the farm with him, he must fight German Nazis and their Czech minions, who are trying to take away the Gestapo archive hidden in the basement of the farm. Among the Nazis is Karel Kučera, the son of the family that once owned the farm where Maděra and his friends have settled. Kučera raids the farm and severely injures Maděra's fiancee Ilona before Maděra shoots him dead.

Maděra then has to deal with cattle poachers, extreme drought of 1947 and with officials from the District Agricultural Administration who have a personal interest in liquidation of Maděra's Grazing Cooperative.

After the communist coup in February 1948, the monstrosity of the communist regime is fully manifested: State security arrests Volhynian Czechs who fled the Stalinist regime from the Soviet Union to Czechoslovakia after the war while Maděra is demoted to a private. Soon afterwards he is arrested and forced by cruel torture to confess to a trumped-up charge of anti-state activity. He is sentenced to 15 years in prison for treason and espionage. At the end of the first season we follows of Maděra's first days in the concentration camp and forced eviction of Maděra's wife and children from the farm.

Season 2
After success of the first 12 episodes, another 8 episodes were filmed four years later. Maděra is still imprisoned and forced to perform slave labor in uranium mines. He gets his strength from presence of other political prisoners, especially his comrades from war. He must also deal with targeted bullying by one of the guards, called Žabák.

In parallel with the events in the penal camp, we follow the persecution of Maděra's family. Maděra's farm is forced to transform itself into a JZD, so that its members can stay together and not be dispersed. The season ends with Maděra returning home after the partial relaxation of the totalitarian regime in the early 1960s. Former poacher Ševčík returns to the town and wants to take revenge on Maděra's family but Putna, the manager of sawmill gets him back to prison. At the end of the second season, one of the "cowboys", Cassidy, dies in accident.

Season 3
Season 3 covers the events from Warsaw Pact invasion of Czechoslovakia to the onset of normalization in 1970. Inhabitants of Svatý Štěpán led by Putna the administrator of the sawmill rehearse a volunteer theater to which they give a strong anti-occupation undertone. Ševčík returns from prison and starts terrorizing Putna and wants to kill him. Putna is saved by Martin Kanda, who kills Ševčík and makes it look like an accident. Maděra is accused of economic crime and briefly imprisoned again.

Season 4
It starts in 1990, followed by a retrospective return to the period of so-called normalization in the 1970s. Protagonists are located on the new farm called Lučina. They were moved there from the original Svatý Štěpán. In Svatý Štěpán, the son of deceased "cowboy" Cassidy, Vašek, who deserted from military service, appears. Martin Kanda helps him to get the blue book so thathe doesn't have to serve in army. Žabák, Maděra's former supervisor in camp, becomes the commander of local State Security district department and begins to bully Maděra and his relatives again. He repeatedly by summons Maděra's relatives and friends for questioning without reason. He also takes one of "cowboys", Harry, into pre-trial detention and does not allow him to be given medication for his chronic illness which causes Harry's death. During the events of November 1989, Žabák destroys all files he kept on Maděra. The series ends with Maděra's death caused by injuries he sustains during fall from horse.

Cast
Martin Dejdar as lieutenant colonel Antonín Maděra
Jana Hubinská as Maděra's wife Ilona
Jiří Schmitzer as Martin Kanda
Markéta Hrubešová as Kanda's wife Alena
Jakub Wehrenberg as "cowboy" Jerry
Jiří Langmajer as "cowboy" Cassidy
Václav Chalupa as "cowboy" Pete
Radim Kalvoda as "cowboy" Bill
Jakub Zdeněk as "cowboy" Harry
Zbyněk Fric as "cowboy" Smile
Jan Teplý Jr. as "cowboy" Currly
Aleš Spurný as "cowboy" Randy
Oldřich Vlach as Brabenec, a chairman of local national council who later becomes government minister 
Jiří Lábus as Ondřej Putna
Pavel Nový as Ševčík aka Mustache
Radek Holub as Hejl

Episodes

Soundtrack
Soundtrack was composed by Zdeněk Barták while the series title song was sung by Marta Kubišová and Karel Černoch.

Filming locations
The series was primarily filmed in Úterý¨village which serves as Svatý Štěpán in the series. Some locals appeared in the series as background characters. Thanks to the series Úterý became popular destination for tourists and filmmakers. Other film locations included Kladruby nad Labem, Solopysky, Motol University Hospital, Ruzyně Prison, sociotherapeutic farm in Bohnice, Velká Chuchle, Příbram Mine, Hradiště Military Training Area, Tábor, Houska Castle, Hrazany, Nová Ves, Vinařice or Kunice.

Book and films
The first season of the series was edited into a two-hour film released in 1997. It is conceived as a reminiscence during a visit of Maděra's wife Ilona in prison. Spin-off television film Žabák was released in 2001.

Books Zdivočelá země and Aukce by the writer and translator Jiří Stránský, on which the series was based, were published together in one volume in 1997 by the Hejkal publishing house. The author finished Zdivočelá země in 1970, but it remained in manuscript until the first edition by Lidové nakladatelství in 1991.

References

External links
Official website

Czech adventure television series
1997 Czech television series debuts
Czech Television original programming
Czech historical television series
Czech drama television series
Warsaw Pact invasion of Czechoslovakia
2012 Czech television series endings